Ncedile Saule is a South African novelist, writer and academic.

Career
Saule was born in Fort Beaufort and is from the Bhayi, Mvulane clan. Saule has written a number of notable works in Xhosa, including Unyana Womntu, which was adapted for television by the SABC in 1989, as well as Umthetho KaMthetho and Inkululeko Isentabeni. He has twice won the Nguni category in the M-Net Literary Awards.

Saule was a Xhosa lecturer at the University of South Africa from 1982 until joining Nelson Mandela Metropolitan University in around 2013. He is a Xhosa lecturer at Rhodes University.

Awards
 1997 M-Net Literary Awards, Nguni category for Ukhozi Olumaphiko
 2011 M-Net Literary Awards, Nguni category for Inkululeko Isentabeni

Works

Novels
 Unyana Womntu
 Idinga
 Ukhozi Olumaphiko
 Indlalifa
 Umlimandlela
 Ilizwe Linjani

Textbooks
 Intaba Kamnqwazi

References

Living people
Academic staff of the University of South Africa
South African male novelists
21st-century South African novelists
Year of birth missing (living people)
21st-century South African male writers
Xhosa-language writers
Academic staff of Nelson Mandela University
20th-century South African novelists
20th-century South African male writers